Zaïs is an opera by Jean-Philippe Rameau first performed on 29 February 1748 at the Opéra in Paris. It takes the form of a pastorale héroïque in four acts and a prologue. The librettist was Louis de Cahusac.

The score is particularly remarkable for its overture, which depicts the emergence of the four elements out of chaos. It looks back to Jean-Féry Rebel's ballet Les élemens and forward to Haydn's overture for his oratorio The Creation.

Roles
According to the published libretto

Synopsis
Zaïs, a genie, disguises himself as a shepherd to win the love of a shepherdess, Zélide. After a series of ordeals in which Zaïs shows he is willing to give up his magic powers for his love, Oromases, the king of the genies, grants Zélide immortality so the couple can marry.

Recordings
 Zaïs, John Elwes (Zaïs),  Marjanne Kweksilber (Zélidie), Max van Egmond (Oromazès), David Thomas (Cindor),  Mieke van der Sluis (Une Sylphide/ La Grande Prêtresse de l'Amour),  Jane Marsch (L'Amour), René Jacobs (Un Sylphe), La Petite Bande conducted by Gustav Leonhardt (3 CDs,Stil, 1975)
 Zaïs, Julian Prégardien (Zaïs), Sandrine Piau (Zélidie), Aimery Lefèvre (Oromazès), Benoït Arnould (Cindor), Amel Brahim-Djelloul (Une Sylphide/ La Grande Prêtresse de l'Amour), Hasnaa Bennani (L'Amour), Zachary Wilder (Un Sylphe), Chœur de Chambre de Namur and Les Talens Lyriques conducted by Christophe Rousset (3 CDs, Aparte, 2015)

References

Sources
Girdlestone, Cuthbert, Jean-Philippe Rameau: His Life and Work, New York: Dover, 1969  (paperback edition)
Holden, Amanda (Ed.), The New Penguin Opera Guide, New York: Penguin Putnam, 2001. 
Sadler, Graham (Ed.), The New Grove French Baroque Masters  Grove/Macmillan, 1988

Operas
Operas by Jean-Philippe Rameau
French-language operas
1748 operas
Opera world premieres at the Paris Opera